Eusebio Blasco Soler (1844–1903) was a Spanish journalist, poet and playwright.

References

External links 

 Obras completas de Eusebio Blasco (in Spanish)

1844 births
1903 deaths
Spanish male dramatists and playwrights
19th-century Spanish poets
Spanish journalists
Spanish male poets
19th-century Spanish dramatists and playwrights
19th-century male writers